Bani Torof 
is the largest and most populous Arab tribe in Iran , Khuzestan province, who live in the area of Azadgan plain, Sosangard, Bostan, Howeiza, and especially the villages of Ahvaz and a part of it in current Basra (Iraq). They are one of the most famous and prominent Arab tribes of Iran, Iraq and other  Arab countries. [1] This clan and Bani Lam Abdul Khan belong to Tay tribe.  The majority of this tribe lives in Azadegan Plain.  Of course, in the beginning of 1314, this name was changed to Mishan Plain. 

Bani Torof are very famous for their active presence in the world war against the British under the leadership of Asi bin Sharhan and Khazal bin Kazem al-Manished, and Matlab bin Sabahan, Saddam bin Zair Ali and Awfi bin Mahawi in the First World War, which was later called the Battle of Jihad or Harb al-Munyur.

"Megwar" is a kind of war mace that was used by Bani Tarab tribe in the war with the British. It is known that Bani Torof warriors used to chant an epic slogan in the face of British soldiers (who were equipped with war cannons): "Ball"  Are you stronger or my "Megwar"?! .Currently, the graves of 67 of the generals killed in this war are located in an area called "Al-Jihad Tomb", which is also a large cemetery (Abuda village). 

This tribe is divided into two groups, Bayt Sayyah and Bayt Saeed. 

Bani Torof families

Ethnic groups in Bangladesh
Yemeni tribes